Agnes Smith is the name of:

Agnes Smith Lewis, Semitic scholar
Agnes Marshall (1855–1905), née Smith, English culinary entrepreneur
Agnes Coolbrith Smith, wife of Joseph Smith